Jason Andrew Jones (born 10 May 1979) is a Welsh former professional footballer who played as a goalkeeper.

Career

Club career
After playing youth football with Liverpool, Jones began his senior career with Swansea City, making 10 appearances in the Football League between 1997 and 2002. While at Swansea, Jones spent a loan spell with both Rhayader Town, and Rhyl. After leaving Swansea, Jones later played with Llanelli.

International career
Jones represented Wales at under-21 level.

References

1979 births
Living people
Welsh footballers
Footballers from Wrexham
Liverpool F.C. players
Swansea City A.F.C. players
Rhayader Town F.C. players
Rhyl F.C. players
Llanelli Town A.F.C. players
English Football League players
Association football goalkeepers